Moob may refer to:
Hmong people
Hmong language
A slang term (portmanteau of "man" and "boob") for gynecomastia
A fictional alien species in Starcross (novel)